Kafr Jammal, is a Palestinian town in the Tulkarm Governorate in the western edge of the West Bank.  It is located about halfway between Qalqilyah and Tulkarm, and has a population of around 3,000. The village is mainly agricultural, and mostly raises olive and citrus crops. Kafr Jammal is at an altitude of 257 meters, and is bordered by Falamya in the west, Kafr Zibad in the east, Jayyous in the south, and Kafr Sur to the north.

History
Ceramics from the Byzantine era have been found here.

Ottoman era
Kafr Jammal was incorporated into the Ottoman Empire in 1517 with all of  Palestine, and in 1596 it appeared under that name in the tax registers as being in the Nahiya of Bani Sa'b, part of the Nablus Sanjak. It had a population of 17 households and 13 bachelors, all Muslims. The villagers paid a fixed tax rate of 33.3% on various agricultural products, such as  wheat, barley, summer crops, olive trees, goats and/or beehives, in addition to "occasional revenues" and a press for olive oil or grape syrup; a total of 11,074 akçe.

In 1838, Kefr Jemmal was noted as a village in the Beni Sa'ab area, west of Nablus. In 1882, the PEF's Survey of Western Palestine described Kefr Jemmal as "a small stone village on a knoll, with
cisterns."

British Mandate era
In the 1922 census of Palestine conducted by the British Mandate authorities, Kufr Jammal had a population of 396 Muslims, increasing in the 1931 census to 499; 1 Christian and 498 Muslims, in 109 houses.

In the 1945 statistics the population of Kafr Jammal was 690 Muslims, with 14,945 dunams of land according to an official land and population survey. Of this, 1,702 dunams were plantations and irrigable land, 4,451 were used for cereals, while 19 dunams were built-up (urban) land.

Jordanian era
In the wake of the 1948 Arab–Israeli War, and after the 1949 Armistice Agreements, Kafr Jammal came under Jordanian rule.  

In 1961, the population of Kafr Jamal was 1,041.

Post 1967
Since the Six-Day War in 1967, Kafr Jammal has been under Israeli occupation.

Kafr Jammal enjoys good relations with neighboring territories, and heavy education and commercial exchange take place among them. The village is also notable for having a large diaspora outside the West Bank, mostly in Jordan, but also in Saudi Arabia and the United States. Kafr Jammal's population follow the Hanbali and Shafi'i fiqh (schools of Sunni Islam).

References

Bibliography

External links
  Welcome To Kafr Jammal
Survey of Western Palestine, Map 11:    IAA, Wikimedia commons

Villages in the West Bank
Tulkarm Governorate
Municipalities of the State of Palestine